The 2022 Liga 3 Final was the final that decided the winner of the 2021–22 Liga 3, the seventh season of third-tier competition in Indonesia organised by PSSI, and the fifth season since it was renamed from the Liga Nusantara to the Liga 3 between Karo United and Putra Delta Sidoarjo. It was played on 30 March 2022 at Gelora Delta Stadium, Sidoarjo.

Karo United won 5–3 on a penalty shoot-out after a 3–3 draw at the end of full time, securing their first title in the competition.

Road to the final

Match

References

Liga 3 Final
Liga 3 Final